Jeremiah Omoto Fufeyin (born 15 February 1971, Burutu, Delta State, Nigeria) is the founder and head prophet of Christ Mercyland Deliverance Ministry (CMDM), Warri, Delta State, Nigeria. He founded the church on 3 April 2010.

Early life and family
Jeremiah Omoto Fufeyin was born in Burutu, Warri, Delta State, Nigeria on 15 February 1971. He had his primary school education at Zuokumor Primary School in Burutu L.G.A of Delta State between 1981 and 1986. His secondary education was at Gbesa Grammar School Ojobo, between 1986 and 1992.

He is married to Anthonia Fufeyin and they have five children. He was born in a polygamous home and is the 22 child out of the 36 children sired by his father, late Livingson Stevenson Toboukeyei Fufeyin and Asetu.

Criticism and controversy
Fufeyin has been criticized for his loud acts of charity, very public and showy focus on demons and "deliverance" in his ministry today. During the COVID-19 pandemic, he donated about N300million to staff, members of his church and to the Nigerian government. Fufuyin also returned their tithes and offerings, that it was time of giving back. Fufeyin has also being criticized of calling himself the first son of T. B. Joshua which he has denied vehemently saying he respects every man of God including T.B Joshua but he has never called himself the first son. Some call him Warri TB Joshua, Niger Delta TB Joshua, Ijaw TB Joshua. He rejected those names stating that he is simply Prophet Jeremiah Omoto Fufeyin.

On 1 April 2017, Fufeyin seemed to have defended Suleman Johnson against his sex scandal, describing him as "innocent."

In April 2022, Fufeyin took Pastor Johnmark Ighosotu to court, alleging character defamation and cyber conspiracies following a confession in Ighosotu's church which contained accusations Fufeyin engaged in fraudulent activities.

References

1972 births
Faith healers
Living people
Nigerian Christian clergy
Nigerian television evangelists
People from Delta State
Prophets